"Kneel Before Me" is a song by American DJs Slander and Crankdat, featuring the British rock band Asking Alexandria. It was released on August 9, 2018 by Monstercat and Sumerian Records and was included a week later on the compilation album Monstercat Uncaged, Vol. 5.

History
In the process of working with Asking Alexandria, Andersen and Land cited the band—among others, such as Avenged Sevenfold, Underoath and Taking Back Sunday—as one of their inspirations. Monstercat CEO Mike Darlington praised the collaboration between his label and Ash Avildsen's Sumerian Records, calling the cross-boundary release "truly inspiring."

In an interview with Vents Magazine, Slander stated they aimed "to make [their] own rendition of hardcore music with dubstep at its core, essentially bringing [their] music roots into 2018!"

Reception 
Stanley Sutton, writing for Dance Music Northwest, stated: "With punishing vocals, and a drop that shows no mercy, this track is about to become every rails’ worst nightmare." Omar Serrano of Run the Trap called the song "the manic dubstep collaboration that opens the portal to hell", and added: "The barbarous sound design accompanies the rough drum kit to offer fans with one of the harshest tunes of the year". Matthew Meadow of YourEDM praised the single, stating: "The drops are absolute insanity, the vocals evoke pure rage and anger, and it’s all tied together with an incredible melody that makes us thank god this collaboration exists in the first place". Dancing Astronaut stated that the song "showcases the producers’ diverse production capabilities as they meld the different genres together into an exciting whole".

Personnel
 Derek Andersen – producer
 Scott Land – producer
 Christian Smith – producer
 Danny Worsnop – vocalist
 Ben Bruce – guitar
 Cameron Liddell – guitar
 Sam Bettley – bass
 James Cassells – drums

References 

Dubstep songs
British rock songs
Asking Alexandria songs
Monstercat singles
Sumerian Records singles
Slander (DJs) songs